Dinosperma is a genus of plant containing the single species Dinosperma erythrococcum, commonly known as tingletongue, clubwood or nutmeg, and is endemic to north-eastern Australia. It is a tree usually with trifoliate leaves arranged in opposite pairs, the leaflets lance-shaped to oblong, and panicles of small white flowers, later bright orange to red, slightly fleshy follicles containing shiny, bluish black seeds.

Description
The leaves have distinct but scattered oil dots.

Taxonomy
In 1858, Ferdinand von Mueller described Euodia erythrococca and published the description in Fragmenta phytographiae Australiae from specimens collected near Wide Bay and Moreton Bay. In 1997, Thomas Gordon Hartley raised the genus Dinosperma in the journal Adansonia and transferred von Mueller's plant as Dinosperma erythrococcum.

Distribution and habitat

Conservation status
This tree is listed as of "least concern" under the Queensland Government Nature Conservation Act 1992.

References

Zanthoxyloideae
Zanthoxyloideae genera
Monotypic Rutaceae genera
Flora of New South Wales
Flora of Queensland
Plants described in 1858
Taxa named by Thomas Gordon Hartley
Taxa named by Ferdinand von Mueller